Ao Bing is a character in the classic Chinese novel Investiture of the Gods (Fengshen Yanyi). He is a dragon prince and the third son of the East Sea Dragon King Ao Guang of the Crystal Palace. He has two brothers named Ao Jia and Ao Yi. Both of them are older than him. Ao Bing was originally revered as a rain god who would bestow the rain at his command upon any individual in need, but, as time passed, his father became corrupt, and soon the people were living in fear of the stormy malevolence of Ao Guang and his three sons. After the divine child-hero Nezha had slain the yaksha Li Gen and been seen creating tremors that threatened to destroy the Crystal Palace of the Dragon King, Ao Bing set out (with his father's consent) to confront Nezha, riding upon a great green beast and accompanied by his father's troops.

Ao Bing duly confronted Nezha and met with a most uncouth reception, prompting him to bellow in rage  "You self-righteous cur! Li Gen was sent to us by the Jade Emperor of Heaven himself and yet, in your madness and insolence, you killed him without remorse. Defend yourself, you dog!" Hero and dragon prince wasted no more breath in words, but flung themselves instead into furious combat, Ao Bing wielding his mighty silver spear and Nezha his death-dealing magic scarf. After the exchange of many bitter blows, Nezha was finally able to overcome his adversary by unleashing a blazing fireball at him from his magic scarf and then trampling his head underfoot before he could recover from the blow. In his death agony, Ao Bing was forced to reveal his true (dragon) form and he died burning inwardly with hatred for his youthful opponent.

After the defeat of the shang Jiang Ziya made him into the god of the parsol star.

In popular culture
 The character increased in popularity in 2019 with the stereoscopic, computer-animated feature film, Ne Zha, was more successful, setting numerous all-time records for box-office grosses, including third-highest-grossing of all films in China and highest-grossing animated film from outside the United States.
 In the 2022 mobile game Dislyte, the character "Long Mian" is chosen as Ao Bing's "avatar", blessed with his powers.

References
 Investiture of the Gods Chapter 12 pages 141 - 143

Investiture of the Gods characters